God Bless The Grass is the sixth studio album by Pete Seeger, released on January 17, 1966 by Columbia Records as CL 2432 (mono) and CS 9232 (stereo). The album cover was designed by R. O. Blechman.

God Bless The Grass focuses on environmental issues and offers inspiration and admiration for nature, taking its title from the included song written by Malvina Reynolds. The songs advocate awareness of the environment and appreciation for the splendor of nature. "My Dirty Stream" for example, supports an environmental organization Seeger formed in 1966 called Hudson River Sloop Clearwater (aka Great Hudson River Revival or Clearwater Festival) that sought to clean up the heavily polluted Hudson River. The liner notes include a message written by then Supreme Court Justice William Douglas.

Track listing

References

1966 albums
Pete Seeger albums
Albums produced by Tom Wilson (record producer)
Columbia Records albums